The  is a railway line in Tokyo, Japan, operated by Seibu Railway. It acts as a branch line of the Seibu Shinjuku Line, with direct trains to Seibu-Shinjuku Station in Tokyo.

Stations
O: stop
 SE: 
 E: 
 HL: 

All trains on this line stop at every station.

Rolling stock
 Seibu 2000 series
 Seibu 6000 series
 Seibu 20000 series
 Seibu 30000 series

A fleet of eight 10-car Seibu 40000 series EMUs is scheduled to be introduced from spring 2017, operating on the Seibu Ikebukuro, Seibu Shinjuku, and Seibu Haijima Lines.

History

 2 November 1928: Opened as Tamako Railway from Hagiyama to Moto-Kodaira (near Kodaira).
 15 August 1932: Electrified at 600 V DC from Hagiyama to Moto-Kodaira.
 12 March 1940: Tamako Railway merged with Musashino Railway (present-day Seibu Railway).
 15 November 1949: Moto-Kodaira Station merged into Kodaira Station.
 15 May 1950: Jōsui Line opened from Ogawa to Tamagawa-Jōsui. Omebashi and Tamagawa-Jōsui stations opened.
 12 October 1954: Electrified at 1,500 V DC from Ogawa to Tamagawa-Jōsui.
 18 March 1955: Electrification raised to 1,500 V DC between Kodaira and Hagiyama.
 1 September 1962: Josui Line opened from Hagiyama to Ogawa. Renamed Jōsui Line from Kodaira to Hagiyama.
 7 November 1967: Double-tracked from Kodaira to Hagiyama.
 15 May 1968: Haijima Line opened from Tamagawa-Jōsui to Haijima, Seibu-Tachikawa station opened. Jōsui Line renamed Haijima Line.
 25 March 1979: Omebashi Station renamed Higashi-Yamatoshi Station.
 7 December 1979: Double-tracked from Hagiyama to Ogawa.
 12 December 1983: Musashi-Sunagawa Station opened.
 1 December 1983: Double-tracked from Musashi-Sunagawa to Seibu-Tachikawa.
 5 March 1987: Nishi-Ogawa passing loop opened. Double-tracked from Nishi-Ogawa to Higashi-Yamatoshi.
 2 November 1988: Double-tracked from Higashi-Yamatoshi to Tamagawa-Jōsui.
 29 March 1991: Double-tracked from Ogawa to Nishi-Ogawa, Nishi-Ogawa passing loop abolished.
 14 June 2008: Haijima Rapid service started. The service stopped at: Kodaira, Tamagawa-Jōsui, Musashi-Sunagawa, Seibu-Tachikawa and Haijima stations.
 30 June 2012: Haijima Rapid service abolished.

References

External links

route map

 
Haijima Line
Railway lines in Tokyo
Haijima Line
Western Tokyo
1067 mm gauge railways in Japan
Railway lines opened in 1928